This is a list of members of the sixth Mpumalanga Provincial Legislature, as elected in the election of 8 May 2019 and taking into account changes in membership since the election.

Current composition

|-style="background:#e9e9e9;"
!colspan="2" style="text-align:left"| Party !! style="text-align:center"| Seats 
|-
|  || 22
|-
|  || 4 
|-
|  || 3
|-
|  || 1 
|-
|colspan="2" style="text-align:left"| Total || style="text-align:right"| 30 
|}

Graphical representation
This is a graphical comparison of party strengths as they are in the 6th Mpumalanga Provincial Legislature.

Note this is not the official seating plan of the Mpumalanga Provincial Legislature.

Members

References

Legislature